The Witch is a 1954 West German drama film directed by Gustav Ucicky and starring Anita Björk, Karlheinz Böhm and Attila Hörbiger. It was shot at the Tempelhof Studios in Berlin and on location in Vienna, Rome, Venice, Capri and Styria. The film's sets were designed by the art director Emil Hasler and Walter Kutz.

Plot
A girl grows up foreseeing the future, and is able to predict the Assassination of Archduke Franz Ferdinand in Sarajevo.

Cast

References

External links

West German films
Films directed by Gustav Ucicky
1950s historical drama films
German historical drama films
Films set in the 1900s
Films set in the 1910s
1954 drama films
German black-and-white films
1950s German films
Films shot at Tempelhof Studios
Films shot in Italy
Films shot in Austria
1950s German-language films